Colorado's 31st Senate district is one of 35 districts in the Colorado Senate. It has been represented by Democrat Chris Hansen since 2020, following the resignation of fellow Democrat Lois Court.

Geography
District 31 is based in the central and southeastern neighborhoods of Denver, including Capitol Hill; the district also includes the Arapahoe County exclaves of Glendale and Holly Hills.

The district is located entirely within Colorado's 1st congressional district, and overlaps with the 2nd, 5th, 6th, 8th, and 9th districts of the Colorado House of Representatives. At 23 square miles, it is the smallest Senate district in the state.

Recent election results
Colorado state senators are elected to staggered four-year terms; under normal circumstances, the 31st district holds elections in presidential years.

2020

2016

2012

Federal and statewide results in District 31

References 

31
Arapahoe County, Colorado
Government of Denver